Giorgio Spavento (died 17 April 1509) was an Italian Renaissance architect and engineer, active in Venice. Probably native to the area of Lake Como, he is first recorded in 1486 when he was appointed as proto (consultant architect and buildings manager) to the Procurators of Saint Mark. As such, he was responsible for most of the public buildings around Saint Mark's Square. He designed the sacristy of the Church of St Mark, the belfry of St Mark's campanile, and the Church of San Teodoro. His principal work is the Church of San Salvador, which was completed by Tullio Lombardo and Jacopo Sansovino.

See also 
Venetian Renaissance architecture

Notes and references

Bibliography 
 Howard, Deborah, The Architectural History of Venice (London: B. T. Batsford, 1980) 
 Howard, Deborah, 'Giorgio Spavento', in The Dictionary of Art, 34 vols (London: Macmillan, 1996) XXIX, pp. 369–370 
 McAndrew, John, Venetian architecture of the early Renaissance (Cambridge, MA: MIT Press, 1980) 

15th-century Italian architects
16th-century Italian architects
Italian Renaissance architects
Architects from Venice
1509 deaths
Year of birth unknown